Edmundston-Madawaska Centre is a provincial electoral district for the Legislative Assembly of New Brunswick, Canada.

It was created as Edmundston in 1967 and was unchanged in the 1973 and 1994.

It was only changed slightly in 2006 but its name was changed to Edmundston-Saint Basile to reflect the fact that the district no longer included all of the City of Edmundston as the city had absorbed several outlying communities in an amalgamation in 1995. The name reflects the fact that the district includes the old city of Edmundston as well as the old town of Saint Basile, New Brunswick.

In 2013, it ceded some more of Edmundston to the neighbouring Madawaska les Lacs-Edmundston, while adding rural territory to the north, east and south of Edmundston.  It was accordingly renamed Edmundston-Madawaska Centre.

Members of the Legislative Assembly

Election results

Edmundston-Madawaska Centre, 2014–present

Edmundston-Saint Basile, 2006–2013

References

External links 
Website of the Legislative Assembly of New Brunswick
Map of Edmundston-Madawaska Centre riding as of 2018

Politics of Edmundston
New Brunswick provincial electoral districts